Feilden Clegg Bradley Studios (also known as FCBStudios) is a British architectural design firm, established in 1978, with offices in Bath, London, Manchester and Belfast. The firm is known for its pioneering work in sustainable design and social design agenda.

In 2008, Accordia, which was also designed by Alison Brooks Architects and Maccreanor Lavington, became the first housing development to win the Royal Institute of British Architects (RIBA) Stirling Prize.

Background
The company was formed in 1978 by architects Richard Feilden (1950–2005) and Peter Clegg, operating from small premises in Bath, Somerset. The company designed and constructed low-energy houses. Over the next two decades the company won awards for a number of school design projects and gained "a formidable reputation in the education sector". With over 100 staff the firm developed an "unusually democratic" way of operating.

Feilden was accidentally killed by a falling tree in 2005 and the practice continued under Peter Clegg and senior partner Keith Bradley.

In 2008 the practice won the RIBA Stirling Prize, with fellow designers Alison Brooks Architects and Macreanor Lavington, for their Cambridge high-density housing development, Accordia. Bradley picked up a cheque for £20,000.

Peter Clegg is part of the steering group who launched the Architects Declare initiative in 2019, to address the construction industry’s impact on the climate crisis and biodiversity loss. 

Feilden Clegg Bradley Studios currently has offices in Bath, London, Manchester and Belfast and works across a wide range of sectors including Education, Housing and Urban Design, and has expertise in heritage, retrofit and low carbon architecture.

Notable projects

Awards
Feilden Clegg Bradley Studios was awarded the 2008 RIBA Stirling Prize for Accordia in Cambridge (with Alison Brooks Architects and Maccreanor Lavington). In 2014 the practice was again shortlisted for the prize, this time for their work on Manchester School of Art.

In 2015 the practice was revealed as the top RIBA Award-winning practice of the past 10 years and overall has been awarded 37 RIBA Awards, four RIBA Sustainability Awards, and 22 Civic Trust Awards. It has been awarded the International Council on Tall Buildings and Urban Habitat (CTBUH) Award for Broadcasting Tower in Leeds, as well as having been recognised by World Architecture Festival, Building Design Architect of the Year, the Wood Awards, SCONUL Library Design Awards, the AJ100 Awards and the Building/UK Green Building Council Sustainability Awards, amongst others.

Richard Feilden Foundation
The Richard Feilden Foundation was set up in memory of Richard Feilden in 2005.
 
The charity’s mission is to support sustainable architecture and education projects in Africa, promoting community involvement and the use of African expertise and technologies. The charity uses the skills and knowledge of the practice to work with like-minded organisations. Projects include an HIV Training Clinic in Mzuzu Malawi, Rubengera Technical Secondary School in Rwanda and a number of schools in Uganda.

References

External links
 
Feilden Clegg Bradley Studios official website

Architecture firms of England
Stirling Prize laureates
Design companies established in 1978